Ithycythara chechoi is a species of sea snail, a marine gastropod mollusk in the family Mangeliidae.

Description

Distribution
I. chechoi can be found in the Gulf of Mexico and the Caribbean waters, ranging from the Bahamas to Cuba at depths between 23 m and 52 m.

References

  Rosenberg, G., F. Moretzsohn, and E. F. García. 2009. Gastropoda (Mollusca) of the Gulf of Mexico, pp. 579–699 in Felder, D.L. and D.K. Camp (eds.), Gulf of Mexico–Origins, Waters, and Biota. Biodiversity. Texas A&M Press, College Station, Texas

External links
 Bioilib;cz : image of Ithycythara chechoi

chechoi
Gastropods described in 2004